The Exceptions were a German demo group formed in the 1980s. They were early pioneers writing demos for the Atari ST platform.

History 

Usually known by the shortened form Tex they formed in the spring 1986 when Eric Simon and Udo Fischer were still teenagers. On obtaining an Atari ST they started exploring what they could do with this new hardware. After finding the initial Basic implementation limiting, they moved onto writing some simple graphical demonstration computer programs in assembly.

After an early period of cracking games software and adding these demo screens to the loaders they eventually realised the coding was more fun. Their first breakthrough was a demo called the Little Color Demo released in the fall of 1987. It was however the release of the then large B.I.G Demo (Best In Galaxy) which propelled them to prominence. It featured a large collection of music ported from various Commodore 64 games by their recently joined musician Jochen Hippel.

They later joined a demo group alliance known as The Union where they were involved in some screens of The Union Demo.

Release history 

The Exceptions released many small cracktros and intros before moving onto proper demo releases. A selection of the more influential releases are listed here:

Members 

Like most demo groups the members used handles or nicknames to identify themselves.
 Mad Max  Jochen Hippel (musician).
 Daryl a.k.a. Michael Raasch (coder).
 ES a.k.a. Erik Simon (graphican).
 6719 a.k.a. Gunter Bitz (coder). His nickname is based on the citycode of his hometown.
 -ME- a.k.a. Udo Fischer (coder).

Notes

External links
The Exceptions demo screen overview on Demozoo.org
Review of the Union Demo, 1989

Demogroups
1986 establishments in Germany
Atari ST